William Sidney Mason (31 October 1908 – 1995) was an English professional footballer who played in the Football League for Queens Park Rangers and Fulham as a goalkeeper.

Career statistics

References 

English footballers
English Football League players
Brentford F.C. wartime guest players
1908 births
1995 deaths
People from Earlsfield
Association football goalkeepers
Wimbledon F.C. players
Fulham F.C. players
Queens Park Rangers F.C. players